Kanoon is a 1960 Indian Hindi film.

Kanoon may also refer to:
 Institute for the Intellectual Development of Children and Young Adults, Iran, commonly known as Kanoon
 Kanoon (1943 film), a Hindi/Urdu social film
 Kanoon (1994 film), Hindi
 Kanoon (TV series), an Indian television courtroom drama/crime series (1993-96)
 Qanun (instrument) or kanoon, a Middle Eastern string instrument

See also
 Cannon (disambiguation)
 Canon (disambiguation)
 Kanon (disambiguation)
 Qanun (disambiguation)
  (including several films)